The Office of Professional Responsibility is the United States Department of Justice's division for investigating misconduct by its employees.

Office of Professional Responsibility may also refer to:

 Office of Professional Responsibility of the U.S. Bureau of Alcohol, Tobacco, Firearms and Explosives (ATF)
 Office of Professional Responsibility of the U.S. Customs and Border Protection (CBP)
 Office of Professional Responsibility of the U.S. Drug Enforcement Administration (DEA)
 Office of Professional Responsibility of the U.S. Federal Bureau of Investigation (FBI)
 Office of Professional Responsibility of the U.S. Federal Emergency Management Agency (FEMA)
 Office of Professional Responsibility of the U.S. Immigration and Customs Enforcement (ICE)
 Office of Professional Responsibility (IRS) of the U.S. Internal Revenue Service (IRS)
 Office of Professional Responsibility of the United States Marshals Service (USMS)
 Office of Professional Responsibility of the U.S. National Park Service (NPS)